The discography of Kate Miller-Heidke, an Australian singer-songwriter, consists of five studio albums, four extended plays, and twenty-three singles.

Miller-Heidke released her first music in 2002 and in 2006, Miller-Heidke was signed to Sony Music Australia. Her 2007 debut studio album Little Eve was a commercial and critical success, gaining gold sales and receiving four nominations at the 2007 ARIA Awards including "Best Female Artist". In 2008, she released her second album Curiouser which became her first top 10 release. The album spawned three top 40 singles, including "Caught in the Crowd", for which she and co-writer Keir Nuttall won the 2008 International Songwriting Competition and "The Last Day on Earth", which became her first ever top 10 single. She released her third studio album, Nightflight, in April 2012. Miller-left Sony Records, and released her fourth solo studio album, O Vertigo! in 2014, independently.

Albums

Studio albums

Live albums

Compilation albums

Collaboration albums

Cast albums and soundtracks

Extended plays

Singles

Collaboration singles

Promotional singles

Videos

Music videos

Lyric videos

Guest appearances

Notes

References 

Discographies of Australian artists
Pop music discographies